John Anthony Schellman (October 24, 1924–December 16, 2014) was an American  biophysical chemist at the University of Oregon, a member of the National Academy of Sciences, a  Biophysical Society Fellow, and an American Physical Society Fellow.

Early life and education 
The son of John A. and Margaret Mary (née Mason) Schellman, John Anthony Schellman was born in Philadelphia on October 24, 1924. His father, a machinist, lost his position when the shop where he worked closed during the Great Depression.  His father delivered milk and eggs in a horse-drawn wagon, and his mother sang Irish ballads in taverns for extra cash. Schellman especially enjoyed high school chemistry, and reportedly came close to burning down the house when a basement experiment caught fire.

After high school, his family's limited finances did not allow him to attend college. Schellman worked in a factory, then in the Philadelphia Gas Works laboratory, a lab doing applied research. He also took a chemistry class after work at Temple University. Drafted during World War II, because of poor eyesight he was deemed unfit for combat, and he was assigned to the Army's medical laboratory at Walter Reed Hospital in Washington. He became head of the laboratory. 

After his army service, Schellman used his G.I. Bill benefits and completed an A.B at Temple University, Phi Beta Kappa, in just two years, in 1948. He earned an M.A. in 1949 and a Ph.D. in Theoretical Chemistry in 1951, both at Princeton University. His dissertation was titled, The Theory of the Dielectric Properties of Ice, and was advised by Walter Kauzmann.

Career

Post-doctoral fellowship 
Schellman's first postdoctoral fellowship was a U.S. Public Health Service award from NIH, with Leo Samuels at the University of Utah Medical School, working to improve chemical and biological assays of steroid hormones. Although he did not find that work interesting, he was still interested in proteins, and transferred his postdoctoral fellowship to Carlsberg Laboratory in Copenhagen, Denmark, with Kaj Linderstrøm-Lang. He and post-doc Bill Harrington were the first to show "protein unfolding transitions were fast and reversible and thus were reactions suitable for quantitative physico-chemical analysis", initiating reversible protein-folding asa major field of work. Schellman also developed "optical rotatory dispersion (ORD)" to measure α-helix and β-sheet secondary structures of proteins.

Robert L. Baldwin wrote,

Schellman's ensuing research led to three important developments. First, he "derived an equation to analyze how the number of H-bonds made between urea molecules in water should change when a concentrated urea solution is diluted", yielding measurements suggesting "the peptide H-bond should be marginally stable in water". Second, he asked, "How stable is a single α-helix in water?" and "concluded from his study that a single α-helix should have borderline stability in water, and that helix length should be a critical variable in determining helix stability". Third, with Harrington he investigated how a neighboring tertiary structure might affect the stability of an α-helix, learning "that indeed tertiary structure and other stabilizing elements (such as inter-chain S-S bonds) might be critical in stabilizing the individual secondary structure elements of globular proteins".

In Copenhagen Schellman met Frances "Charlotte" Green, of St. Joseph, Missouri, who was a post-doc from Cal Tech, and they married in 1954. (She developed the "Schellman motif", on α-helix termination in proteins by a characteristic sequence.) According to Baldwin and von Hippel, "Their ORD results were published in a magnum opus (seven papers on ten proteins) in 1958, after they had left the Carlsberg Lab."

Faculty positions 
In 1956 Schellman joined the faculty of the Chemistry Department of the University of Minnesota. In 1958 the Schellmans moved to the University of Oregon, where he held joint appointments as an associate professor in the departments of Chemistry and the Institute of Molecular Biology, and she was an adjunct professor. He was promoted to professor in 1963, and he retired as professor emeritus in 1990.

Of Schellman's work at Oregon, Robert Baldwin and Peter von Hippel wrote,

In a special festschrift issue of the journal Biophysical Chemistry upon Schellman's retirement in 2002, Hong Qian, James Hofrichter, and Robert L. Baldwin wrote that his scientific career hasd "paralleled the development of biophysical chemistry." Referring to his "landmark paper on the stability of the α-helix in 1955", as well as his research and teaching, they commented on his work in the tradition of Linderstrøm-Lang, with his wife Charlotte. They wrote he was "instrumental in bringing the rigor and methodology of physical chemistry (yes, including physics, mathematics and spectroscopy!) into the center stage of biochemistry and molecular biology. An essential characteristic of John's work is the integration of theoretical analysis with experimental measurement."

Colleague Henryk Eisenberg wrote that Schellman's studies were strong "in the examination of biological macromolecules, proteins and nucleic acids, in terms of their interactions with large and small molecules, solvents and solutes, sometimes in 'crowded' environments, mimicking biological media." Eisenberg said Shellman's contributions included, "fluctuations and linkage relations in macromolecular solutions w25x, a simple model for solvation in mixed solvents w26x, the relation between the free energy of interaction and binding w27x and the thermodynamics of solvent exchange w28x."

Selected publications

Awards, honors 

 1959–1963 Sloan Fellow
 1962–1967 BBC Study Section of NIH
 1969–1970 Guggenheim Fellow, Department of Chemical Physics, Weizmann Institute, Rehovot, Israel

 1982 Elected to the National Academy of Sciences
 1983 American Physical Society Fellow, cited For the application of rigorous physical theory and the development of novel experimental techniques to increase our understanding of the structure and behavior of biological macromolecules, especially proteins and nucleic acids.

 1983 Member, American Academy of Arts and Sciences
 1983 Honorary Doctorate, Chalmers University, Sweden

 1986 Chalmers 150th Anniversary Professorship, Chalmers University, Gothenburg, Sweden
 1990 Honorary Doctorate, University of Padua, Italy
 2001 Fellow, Biophysical Society

References 

1924 births
2014 deaths
American biophysicists
Fellows of the American Physical Society
Princeton University alumni
Temple University alumni
University of Minnesota faculty
University of Oregon faculty